.cg is the Internet country code top-level domain (ccTLD) for the Republic of the Congo. It is administered by ONPT Congo and Interpoint Switzerland.  Citizens of the Republic of the Congo are entitled to one free domain registration, directly at the second level of .cg.  Additional registrations, and registrations by foreigners, have a cost of €225/year .

References

External links
IANA .cg whois information
.cg domain registration website

Country code top-level domains
Communications in the Republic of the Congo

sv:Toppdomän#C